AUSU may refer to:

 Aberdeen University Sports Union
 Algoma University Students' Union
 Athabasca University Students' Union